Aggarwal is a surname.  See List of Agrawals.

Notable people with the surname include:

 Aarthi Aggarwal (active from 2001), Indian actress who primarily acts in Telugu films
 Ankit Aggarwal (born 1983), Indian cricketer
 Anu Aggarwal (born 1969), Indian model and film actress
 Bharat Aggarwal, Indian-American biochemist
 Faqir Chand Aggarwal (born 1932), Indian politician
 Jai Bhagwan Aggarwal (born 1952), Indian politician
 Jai Parkash Aggarwal (born 1944), Indian politician
 K. K. Aggarwal (born 1948), Indian electronic and communications engineer and IT specialist
 K. K. Aggarwal (cardiologist) (born before 1979), Indian cardiologist
 Kajal Aggarwal (born 1985), Indian actress who primarily acts in Telugu and Tamil films
 Mira Aggarwal (born 1961), Indian politician
 Neha Aggarwal (born 1990), Indian female Olympic table tennis player
 Pramod Agarwal, Indian businessman
 Raj Aggarwal (born before 1958), Indian author and contributor to the fields of finance and international business studies
 Raj K Aggarwal (born 1949), pharmacist, public health specialist, businessman and first Honorary Consul for India in Wales
 Rakesh Aggarwal (born 1975), British businessman
 Sudarshan K. Aggarwal (born 1935), Indian physician and radiologist
 Vinod Aggarwal (born 1953), American academic political scientist
 Radhika Aggarwal, Indian entrepreneur